Bulbophyllum filiforme is a species of epiphytic plant in the family Orchidaceae, found in Cameroon and Nigeria, where its natural habitat is subtropical or tropical dry, lowland evergreen forests. It was botanically described in 1895, and is currently threatened by habitat loss due to the clearing of forests for the establishment of plantations and other agricultural ventures. B. filiforme is the basionym for Vermeulen's treatment of it as Bulbophyllum resupinatum var. filiforme (Kraenzl.) J.J.Verm.

Sources 

filiforme
Critically endangered plants
Plants described in 1895
Orchids of Cameroon
Orchids of Nigeria
Epiphytic orchids
Taxonomy articles created by Polbot
Taxa named by Friedrich Wilhelm Ludwig Kraenzlin